Kawānanakoa is a surname. Notable people with the name include:

Abigail Campbell Kawānanakoa (1882–1945), a princess by marriage of the Kingdom of Hawaiʻi and politician of the state of Hawaii
Abigail Kapiolani Kawānanakoa (1903–1961), a daughter of David Kawānanakoa and Abigail Campbell Kawānanakoa
Abigail Kinoiki Kekaulike Kawānanakoa (1906–2022), daughter of Lydia Liliuokalani Kawānanakoa and adoptive daughter of Abigail Campbell Kawānanakoa
David Kawānanakoa or Kahalepouli Kinoiki Kawānanakoa (1868–1908), a prince of the Kingdom of Hawaiʻi and founder of the House of Kawānanakoa
David Kalākaua Kawānanakoa (1904–1953), also known as Prince Koke, a member of the House of Kawānanakoa and the only son of David Kawānanakoa and Abigail Campbell Kawānanakoa
Edward A. Kawānanakoa (1924–1997), member of the House of Kawānanakoa
Lydia Liliuokalani Kawānanakoa (1905–1969), a daughter of David Kawānanakoa and Abigail Campbell Kawānanakoa
Quentin Kawānanakoa (born 1961), American politician of the state of Hawaii

See also
House of Kawānanakoa or the Kawānanakoa Dynasty, descendants of the royal family of the Kingdom of Hawaiʻi